Bianca Cook, also known as Bianca Walkden (born 29 September 1991) is a British taekwondo athlete and Olympian. She is a three-time World champion, twice World Grand Prix champion, four-time European champion and a double Olympic medallist.

Career 
She represented Great Britain at 2016 Olympic Games winning a bronze medal. Walkden is a triple World champion, four time European champion,  and twice World Grand Prix Final champion in her division. In 2017 she became the first practitioner ever to win all 4 Grand Prix events in her division in a single season (having also won the one-off Grand Prix Final in London of the truncated 2016 season).

In May 2015, she won the gold medal in the +73kg category at the 2015 World Taekwondo Championships in Russia beating Gwladys Epangue in the final. She became only the second Briton to win a world title after Sarah Stevenson in 2001 and 2011, and the third to win a global title after Stevenson and Jade Jones' Olympic success in 2012.

In June 2017, Walkden successfully defended her world title in Muju, South Korea during the 2017 Muju WTF World Taekwondo Championship. She beat American Jackie Galloway 14–4 in the heavyweight division. She joins Jade Jones as the only British practitioners to defend a global title, and becoming the only Briton to successfully defend a World title in taekwondo.

In May 2019, at the 2019 World Taekwondo Championships, Walkden won the women's heavyweight title after Zheng Shuyin was disqualified after attaining a 20–10 lead. Faced with Zheng's subsequent inactivity, Walkden adopted the tactic of repeatedly forcing her opponent out of the ring to raise her penalty points from seven to ten, an automatic disqualification. This resulted in boos during the result announcement and medal presentation, when Zheng fell to her knees. Great Britain performance director Gary Hall took issue with her "disrespectful manner" at the presentation. Walkden defended her tactics, saying: "I went out there needing to find a different way to win and a win is a win if you disqualify someone - it's not my fault."

In September 2019, at Chiba, four months after winning the controversial gold medal in Manchester, Walkden was defeated 7-5 by Zheng Shuyin. In October 2019 at Sofia, Zheng Shuyin again defeated Walkden by 3–2.

In 2021, she won the gold medal in the women's +73 kg event at the 2021 European Taekwondo Championships held in Sofia, Bulgaria.

Personal life 
She has been in a relationship with British-born Moldovan taekwondo fighter Aaron Cook since 2008, and the pair married in 2022. She has lived with fellow British taekwondo fighter, and double Olympic champion, Jade Jones, in Manchester, since 2010. The trio train almost every day at GB Taekwondo's National Taekwondo Centre.

References

External links

1991 births
Living people
English female taekwondo practitioners
European Games competitors for Great Britain
European Taekwondo Championships medalists
Martial artists from Liverpool
Medalists at the 2016 Summer Olympics
Medalists at the 2020 Summer Olympics
Olympic bronze medallists for Great Britain
Olympic medalists in taekwondo
Olympic taekwondo practitioners of Great Britain
Taekwondo practitioners at the 2015 European Games
Taekwondo practitioners at the 2016 Summer Olympics
Taekwondo practitioners at the 2020 Summer Olympics
World Taekwondo Championships medalists